"My Girl Josephine" is a song written by Fats Domino and Dave Bartholomew. Domino recorded the song on Imperial Records (Imperial 5704) in 1960, and it charted at number 7 on the Billboard R&B charts and number 14 on the Billboard pop charts. The song is also listed and recorded as "Josephine" and "Hello Josephine" in various cover versions.

Charts

See also
"Josephine" (Wayne King song), also covered by Bill Black's Combo

References

1960 singles
Fats Domino songs
Songs written by Dave Bartholomew
1960 songs
Songs written by Fats Domino
Imperial Records singles